Jean Adhémar (18 March 1908 – 30 June 1987) was a French librarian, academic, and art historian. He was born in Paris, France.

Adhémar was Curator of the "Cabinet Des Estampes (prints)" at the Bibliothèque Nationale de France from 1932 to 1961, and headed the department from 1961 until 1972. He introduced photography to the Bibliothèque.

Adhémar graduated from the École Nationale des Chartes and held a Doctorate ès Lettre from the Sorbonne. He was a professor at the École du Louvre and at the Université Libre de Bruxelles.

As a young scholar, Adhémar was an affiliate of the Warburg Institute in London. He introduced France to the ideas and methods of Erwin Panofsky, Meyer Schapiro, and Edgar Wind by broadening its analysis and research to widen the field of human mentality history. He published 
articles, books, and catalogues, and was considered one of the world's foremost experts on prints (with a predilection for the 19th century).

Adhémar was the editor of the Gazette des Beaux-Arts until his death, and was the founder of the Nouvelles de l'Estampe (1963).

Sources
 

1908 births
1987 deaths
Librarians from Paris
French art historians
Academic staff of the Université libre de Bruxelles
Academic staff of the École du Louvre
Commanders of the Ordre national du Mérite
Commandeurs of the Légion d'honneur
20th-century French historians
French male non-fiction writers
20th-century French male writers